The Round Table: The Commonwealth Journal of International Affairs is an international relations journal established in 1910 relating to the Commonwealth of Nations.

History
The journal was established in 1910 as an off-shoot of the Round Table movement, established the previous year to promote closer union between the United Kingdom and its self-governing colonies. It was initially subtitled, 'A Quarterly Review of the Politics of the British Empire'. Though some of those associated with the Round Table movement promoted Imperial Federation, a proposal to create a federated union in place of the existing British Empire, it was early on agreed that the journal 'should not come out flat-footed' in favour of constitutional change, and disagreements within the Round Table movement meant that it never did.

It was founded by Lord Milner, former High Commissioner for South Africa, Lord Selborne, his successor, and members of "Milner's Kindergarten", who were associated with Milner through their work in the South African Civil Service, including:
Lionel Curtis
Philip Kerr – Liberal politician and, later, British Ambassador to United States
Geoffrey Dawson – Times journalist
Robert Brand

They were soon  joined by others including Leo Amery, F.S. Oliver, and Alfred Zimmern.

In line with the developing idea of the British Empire turning into a 'Commonwealth' promoting progressive self-government, which emerged from the 'studies' of the Round Table movement, the sub-title of the journal was changed in 1919 to 'A Quarterly Review of the Politics of the British Commonwealth'.

Post-World War II, its subtitle was altered to 'A Quarterly Review of British Commonwealth Affairs' to reflect the changing nature of the Commonwealth and the lesser concentration on the domestic politics of Commonwealth member states. It became less a journal espousing a particular view and more a forum to exchange opinions. Its sub-title was changed again in 1966, to 'The Commonwealth Quarterly'.

The journal temporarily ceased in 1982 but was revived in 1983 with its current sub-title.

Journal content 
Until 1966 all articles in the journal were anonymous, ostensibly so that people in positions of authority could write frankly without fear of the consequences. Most of the authors of articles prior to 1966 have been identified, and included Lord Balogh, Sir Evelyn Baring, Sir Alexander Cadogan, Isaac Deutscher, Lord Gladwyn, Lord Hankey, Elspeth Huxley, T.E. Lawrence, Sir Harry Luke, Ali A. Mazrui, Sir Lewis Namier, Lionel Robbins, Garfield Todd, Arnold Toynbee, and Sir Frederick Whyte. An index to all news stories and authors from 1910 to 1966 can be found here.

From 1910 until the 1960s the journal carried regular news and analysis contributed by the Round Table groups in Canada, Australia, New Zealand, and South Africa. There were also regular articles from India, from 1918 the United States, from 1921 the Irish Free State, and after the Second World War Pakistan, Ceylon, Southern Rhodesia, and east Africa. These regular contributions all petered out in the 1960s,

Since 1983 the journal has included a regular 'Commonwealth Update' section, summarising political and other developments across the Commonwealth. This was written for many years by Derek Ingram.  The current Update editor is Oren Gruenbaum.

Since 2012 the journal has included a regular 'Opinion' section, comprising shorter and usually policy-relevant pieces.

Other activities 

The Round Table runs a website which provides news and commentary on Commonwealth topics, additional to what is published in the journal. The current editor is Debbie Ransome.

The editorial board of the journal organises occasional conferences and public meetings on Commonwealth matters, usually including a one-day public conference in the UK before each CHOGM, and a two-day residential conference after. Reports are published on the website.

In addition to the editorial board in the UK and an international advisory board drawn from across the Commonwealth, there are 'chapters' of the journal in Australia, Bangladesh, India, and Malaysia, which organise their own activities.

The Round Table annually awards a Harry Hodson prize for a publishable article by anyone aged 30 years or younger as on 31 December of the year in which the article is submitted, and a Peter Lyon prize, for the best policy-relevant article published in each calendar year.

From 2009 to 2018, the Round Table, in association with its publisher, Routledge, funded a Routledge/Round Table Studentship, for a student from a Commonwealth country other than the UK, studying for the MA in Human Rights at the Institute of Commonwealth Studies, University of London, Since 2019 it has funded two annual Routledge/Round Table Commonwealth Studentships for doctoral students, one for a UK-based student and the other for a student from another Commonwealth country.

List of editors
 1910–16: Philip Kerr, later British Ambassador to the United States
 1917–19: Reginald Coupland, Beit Professor of History at Oxford
 1919–20: Geoffrey Dawson, former editor of The Times
 1921–34: John Dove
 1934–39: Henry Vincent Hodson, later editor of the Sunday Times
 1939–41: Reginald Coupland
1941: Geoffrey Crowther
1941-42: Henry Brooke
 1942–44: Geoffrey Dawson, former editor of The Times
 1945–65: Dermot Morrah
 1965–70: Leonard Beaton
 1970-71: Michael Howard and Robert Jackson
 1972–75: Robert Jackson
 1975–79: Alexander MacLeod
 1979–81: Evan Charlton
 1982: publication suspended
 1983–2004: Peter Lyon
 2004–08: Andrew Williams
 2009–present: Venkat Iyer, University of Ulster

References

External links
 Archive.org (sign in to view links and footnotes)
 The Round Table: A Brief History at The Round Table website.
 Background information on The Round Table publication

Commonwealth Family
English-language journals
International relations journals
Publications established in 1910